Carulla is a surname. Notable people with the surname include:

Juan Carulla (1888–1968), Argentine physician and politician
Mario Carulla (born 1971), Peruvian badminton player
Montserrat Carulla (1930–2020), Spanish actress
Ramón Alberto Carulla Trujillo (born 1936), Cuban artist

Catalan-language surnames